The 2008–09 season was Perth Glory FC's 4th season since the inception of the A-League and 12th since the club's founding, in 1996.

2008–09 Squad

Squad changes for 2008–09 season

|- style="vertical-align: top;"
|
In:
 Eugene Dadi – From Hapoel Acre F.C.
 Josip Magdic – From Floreat Athena
 Adriano Pellegrino – From North Eastern MetroStars
 Adrian Trinidad – From KL PLUS FC 
 Frank Jurić – From Hannover 96 
 Mark Lee – From ECU Joondalup
 Hayden Doyle – From Niki Volou FC 
 Amaral – From Grêmio Recreativo Barueri 
 Scott Bulloch – From Sorrento FC
 Wayne Srhoj – From FC Timişoara 
 Victor Sikora – From FC Dallas 96 
|
Out:
 Leo Bertos – To Wellington Phoenix
 Simon Colosimo – To Sydney FC
 Billy Celeski – To Melbourne Victory
 Jerry Karpeh – To Whittlesea Zebras
 Jordan Simpson – Released
 David Micevski – To Western Knights
 Tyler Simpson – To Blacktown City Demons
 Stan Lazaridis – Retired
 Mitchell Prentice – To Sydney FC

Friendlies

China Tour

Perth Glory began their pre-season early, with a three match trip to China, in early March. The team played three matches against three Chinese Super League sides, Changchun Yatai, Changsha Ginde and Guangzhou Pharmaceutical. Glory lost all three matches, but the tour was successful for trialling many new players in the lineup.

Local Friendlies
In June, the Perth Glory squad took on Football West State League side Rockingham City in Port Kennedy, defeating the side 8–0 in front of a crowd of around 1,500. Glory also played the WA State Team, losing 2–3, with David Tarka making a successful return to competitive football in the match, after being out of the game through a hamstring injury for the past ten months.

Indonesia Tour
Finally in July, Perth Glory embarked on a short pre-season tour of Indonesia, playing and defeating Indonesian Super League sides, Persik Kediri and Deltras Sidoarjo, 2–1 and 1–0 respectively. Mitchell was able to give new recruits, like Eugene Dadi, Adrian Trinidad and Amaral a good run as well as a competitive hit out for younger State League recruits to impress, like Josip Magdic who scored the winner against Deltras Sidoarjo.

Pre-Season Cup

Unlike last season, Perth were not as successful in this season's Pre-Season Cup, though also unlike last season, Glory had some pre-season cup games scheduled at home this time. Adrian Trinidad impressed, including creating and scoring a penalty in the first match against the Newcastle Jets, in Mandurah.

2008–09 Hyundai A-League fixtures

Home-and-Away Season

Goal scorers
Last updated 24 January 2009

Notes and references

2008-09
2008–09 A-League season by team